Leyla Harding (also Cavanagh) is a fictional character from the British ITV soap opera, Emmerdale, played by Roxy Shahidi. She made her first on-screen appearance on 11 August 2008 and was introduced by series producer, Anita Turner. The character departed on 5 August 2011. Shahidi returned to Emmerdale for two episodes on 25 December 2013. She returned full-time in January 2014. On 5 January 2018, Shahadi took maternity leave from the show whilst pregnant with her first child. She returned on 3 October 2018.

Casting
In July 2008, the Prestwich Advertiser reported that actress Roxy Shahidi had joined the cast of Emmerdale as Leyla Harding. Shahidi signed an initial six-month contract. She said of her casting: "I’ve been filming for two weeks now and it’s great. [...] I’ve done a lot of theatre but not much TV work up to now so it’s great for me to work on such a popular and well established show. It’s a dream come true in fact." Shahidi later said that she was "so excited", commenting: "This is a brilliant opportunity for me as I've done lots of theatre but not much TV. Everyone at Emmerdale has been so warm and welcoming. It's such a well-established show and I can't wait to see what Leyla gets up to." Emmerdale series producer Anita Turner added, "Rokhsaneh is a terrific actress and an exciting new addition to the cast. Leyla's going to have some fun stirring up the factory."

Character development

Characterisation

Leyla is described as "streetwise" and "savvy". Shahidi described her as "very down to earth", "very lovable" and "really ballsy". Leyla was initially a new worker at Eric Pollard's (Chris Chittell) factory and it was said that she would immediately get on the right side of him. Leyla is reluctant to talk about her past, which sparks speculation about why she has moved to the village. Channel Five's soap opera reporting website Holy Soap describe Leyla as a "naive, honest, hard worker who can sometimes be a bit too trusting of people". What's on TV deemed her an "attractive woman". Shahidi told the Daily Mirror that she and Leyla are "quite similar in some ways" saying "We're both pretty ditsy and we have the same sense of fun. Leyla says things without thinking, and I can do that too." She added that their lives and relationships are very different because she and Leyla are "worlds apart".

Relationship with David Metcalfe
Leyla begins a relationship with Eric's son, David Metcalfe (Matthew Wolfenden). In October 2009, Leyla sleeps with her new boss, Nathan Wylde (Lyndon Ogbourne). However, when she admits that she regrets cheating on David, Nathan warns that he will not let her forget what happened and begins a "campaign of manipulation". Of the plot, Ogbourne told the Press Association: "The switch between being such a seemingly nice guy and the malicious way he's controlling Leyla is quite horrific." He added that Nathan would get "worse and worse" and could "easily fit into the cast of American Psycho by the end of it". Leyla then fears that Nathan will tell David the truth. Shahidi said this causes Leyla to be "under a lot of stress". However, Leyla confesses to David. Leyla and David later reconcile. Wolfenden said he believes that Leyla is the "right woman" for David, despite "all of the things she has done to him". He said "David seems to be under the thumb, and Leyla gets away with cheating, stealing and having a secret son. But David has been good enough to put that to one side, so because of that I reckon she must be the right girl for him."

Family
In May 2010, Digital Spy reported that Leyla's sister, Alicia Gallagher (Natalie Anderson), would be introduced. The website said Alicia arrives in the village and makes it clear that she has unfinished business with Leyla. Leyla and Alicia's relationship is "far from perfect". Leyla is forced to deal with Alicia's arrival in an attempt to keep her "murky and scandal-ridden" past buried. Anderson said that Alicia was set to make life quite complicated for Leyla. Emmerdale series producer Gavin Blyth added that Alicia will start stirring things up in Leyla's life the minute she sets foot in the village. Alicia arrives in the village to warn Leyla that she does not want her at their mother's funeral. However, Leyla ignores Alicia and they "have a bit of a screaming match" at the funeral, which leaves Alicia annoyed. Discussing what caused the "bad blood" between Alicia and Leyla in an interview with Digital Spy, Anderson said, "All I can really say is that something has definitely gone on between them! [...] The biggest clue I can give is that Alicia is fiercely protective of her family unit and she doesn't want anything to come between that. So you can read into that what you want!" Anderson said that Alicia does not want to cause trouble, but does not want Leyla around. Anderson added that Alicia would "prefer it if [Leyla] just disappeared". Alicia was introduced along with her husband, Justin (Andrew Langtree), and their son, Jacob (Joe-Warren Plant).

In September 2010, it was revealed that Leyla was the biological mother of Jacob. Shahidi said that she was "really shocked" when she learned about the storyline, but was also excited as she thought it would be "really interesting" to play. She opined that the storyline would bring a new dimension to Leyla. Shahidi was involved in Warren-Plant's casting as Jacob. Shahidi admitted that she was surprised that Leyla had not seen Jacob for so long, but understood as Leyla wanted to get on with her life and escape her past. Shahidi said that Leyla just wants to be Jacob's aunt. Leyla wants to see Jacob and interact with him like a normal aunt and nephew. Shahidi had previously said that Leyla kept the secret as she wanted to get on with her life. Shahidi also said that the easiest way for Leyla to move on in her life was to ignore it.

Leyla takes Jacob to a birthday party, where he goes into anaphylactic shock due to an allergic reaction to some cake. Speaking about the plot, Shahidi commented: "It's Leyla's fault because she hasn't listened to her sister's warnings about not letting Jacob eat anything because of his nut allergy." Shahidi added that if Leyla had listened to Alicia, it could have been avoided. The situation shocks Leyla and makes her realise that Alicia is Jacob's mother and needs to be listened to. Shahidi said that Leyla needs to learn to be "less full-on" and stop "indulging and spoiling" Jacob.

Departure (2011)
In June 2011, the Daily Star Sunday reported that Shahidi was to leave Emmerdale. Speaking to the newspaper, Shahidi confirmed: "I have had an amazing three years at Emmerdale and it has been a really tough decision to leave." She filmed her final scenes as Leyla later that month. Shahidi admitted to We Love Telly that it took her six months to reach the decision to leave the show. The actress explained that Anderson helped her reach the decision as she has experience of leaving a long-running serial. Shahidi said that viewers would see a "desperate" side to Leyla in the build-up to her departure.

Reintroduction (2013)
Leyla returned to Emmerdale during the episode broadcast on 25 December 2013. Shahidi revealed that when she received the call from producer Kate Oates about coming back, it came at the "perfect time." She was initially in talks about coming back earlier, but the play she was appearing extended its run. She continued, "I went away from that not knowing whether Leyla was coming back, but then when Kate got in touch with this Christmas Day storyline, it just felt like fate because it was a much better way for Leyla to come back into the show." Shahidi said that she had always hoped Leyla would return at some point and she was excited about Leyla's return storyline. The show's producers decided not to announce Shahidi's return, so viewers would be surprised. When asked how long she would be staying with the show, she quipped that Leyla would have "lots of exciting stuff" in 2014 and she and Anderson had spent time filming on location. The actress added "After that, there's stuff in the pipeline but I haven't read the scripts yet!"

Alicia later finds Leyla working as a pole dancer. To prepare for the storyline, Shahidi took pole dancing lessons and had to wear a PVC catsuit. Shahidi explained that it was important for viewers to warm to Leyla and she did not want to be wearing "a little pair of panties", as it may have been off putting to some. She thought the catsuit was the perfect outfit for Leyla as it made her look ridiculous. She told Susan Hill from the Daily Star that she enjoyed the fact Leyla did not come back to the village straight away following her appearance at Christmas, saying "It means the viewers can see what she's been doing while she's been away." Hill reported that there would be "lots of twists and turns" as Leyla continues to work on her relationships with her sister and son. Shahidi added that she was looking forward to the next chapter in Leyla's life.

Storylines

2008–2011
Leyla visits Emmerdale for a job interview with Eric Pollard (Chris Chittell). She tells him that she won Machinist of the Year in 2007 and left her last job because of "inappropriate overtime" with a young manager. Eric gives her the job and Leyla soon makes friends with her colleagues and joins the St. Mary's Church Choir, formed to enter a competition and save the church from closure.

Months later, colleague Lily Butterfield (Anne Charleston) sees Leyla leaving the building late at night and arriving very early. Eventually, Leyla reveals she is sleeping there and that she was at university. Unfortunately her part-time jobs as a cleaner and barmaid meant things got on top of her and she left. Lily asked Leyla to move in with her and Edna Birch (Shirley Stelfox), Lily's sister, who was unhappy with the arrangement so Lily and Leyla joined Pearl Ladderbanks (Meg Johnson). When Pearl or Lily ask Leyla about her family, she is evasive.

Leyla is interested in David Metcalfe (Matthew Wolfenden), inviting him to a concert but he is sidetracked by Nicola De Souza (Nicola Wheeler), who is upset due to thinking that her father is terminally ill. On learning Rodney is healthy, David tells Leyla he can go after all. In early February, they go out for the night and meets Skin (Greg Wood), who drives them back to Emmerdale. When Skin tries getting close to Leyla, she makes him sleep in his van. The next day, Pearl sees him leaving with their valuables. David, by chance, knocks him down and Leyla kisses him as a thank you. They have a brief relationship but he breaks up her when she believes he has feelings for Nicola. In April, they reconcile and Leyla tells David that her mother is in a care home, so she needs to earn more to fund it. They grow closer when campaigning for his election to the local council, which he wins that June.

Leyla starts work as deputy manager of the farm shop opened by Natasha Wylde (Amanda Donohoe) in the village. On seeing Maisie's new shoes, Leyla was jealous and stole £250 from the shop for a pair, planning to put it back when she got paid. However, Natasha's son Nathan (Lyndon Ogbourne) found out and surprised Leyla be being understanding. After going to a concert together, they got drunk and had a one-night stand. Attempting to quit her job, Nathan turned nasty and blackmailed her, but made David suspicious. In November, she admits to her one-night stand with Nathan and, disgusted, he left. When he saw Nathan attacking Leyla, he punched him and later forgave her, reuniting in December. Leyla bought the farm shop and renamed it "Leyla's".

Now officially together, they bought Farrers Barn. Leyla got the news that her mum had died and insisted on attending the funeral alone. She comforted her sister Alicia Gallagher (Natalie Anderson), during the service but Alicia insisted Leyla leave, saying that she could not be trusted. Leyla later visited her sister's house and watched her with her husband, Justin, and young son, Jacob (Joe-Warren Plant). She met Justin several times in secret, making David think she was having an affair. She swore she wasn't but wouldn't explain so David left for a council trip, thinking Leyla was lying. While away, Alicia and Jacob visited and Leyla's difficult relationship with her mother and sister was explained. Jacob is, in fact, Leyla's son. When she was 18, she got pregnant accidentally and her mum and Alicia encouraged her to let Alicia and her husband adopt the baby, despite Leyla not wanting to give Jacob away after he was born. After much persuasion, Leyla gave Jacob to Alicia as she couldn't have children and she felt like she owed her. It was later revealed that Alicia's husband is, in fact Jacob's biological father, after a drunken one night stand with Leyla.

When Alicia revealed that she and Justin had split up, Leyla insisted they stay with her and David. David was unhappy but accepted it to make Leyla happy. Alicia soon got a job as barmaid at The Woolpack but annoyed David by assuming that Leyla would babysit. Eventually, David got so fed up of the complications that having Jacob around caused, he demanded Leyla choose: him or Jacob. She promptly left but later sent Jacob a present. After Alicia and David tell Jacob that Leyla is his birth mother, Jacob begins emailing Leyla.

2013–present
Leyla returns, demanding to speak to Alicia and Jacob. She meets David and tells him that Jacob has been emailing her, as he knows she is his biological mother. Leyla then learns that David is marrying Alicia. Val Pollard (Charlie Hardwick) lock Leyla in a cupboard, to stop her ruining the wedding. She is later let out and sees Alicia, who promptly slaps her.

Alicia sees that Jacob is confused and upset, following Leyla's visit, and agrees to let her be part of Jacob's life. After dropping Leyla at her flat, Alicia sees her leave and follows her to a strip club. She learns that Leyla is now a pole dancer and angrily drags her offstage before being arrested on suspicion of soliciting. They are released the next day and Leyla returns to Emmerdale with Alicia, much to David's annoyance. Leyla makes friends with Priya Sharma (Fiona Wade) who helps her get a job at the factory. She moves in with Katie Sugden (Sammy Winward). Leyla tries to help Priya through her pregnancy, as she has an eating disorder. She is surprised to learn that David is the baby's father but more concerned that Priya is putting the baby at risk. She denies that she has an eating problem but finally confides in her and Leyla accompanies Priya to a scan, where they are told the baby is smaller than average, but unharmed. However, Priya is worried but repeatedly tells Leyla not to tell anyone, adamant that she can cope alone. However, Leyla tells Jai Sharma (Chris Bisson), and he forces her to eat a biscuit, making her angry. She is also angry with Leyla for telling him but Leyla also tells Alicia.

Alicia receives a £70,000 inheritance from the recently deceased Keith Cheesedale. Alicia accepts the money and learns that Mr. Cheesedale was Leyla's boss/lover. The money was mistakenly given to Alicia as Leyla's stage name was "Alicia Harding". Alicia and David refuse to give Leyla the money until Jacob throws it in the river. David and Leyla recover most of it and she repays Jacob the money he lent her and gives Alicia and David enough for a new car. A delighted Leyla then enjoys her windfall.

Leyla later becomes business partners with Megan Macey (Gaynor Faye) and they decide to base their new-found business around wedding planning. They plan Laurel Thomas (Charlotte Bellamy) and Marlon Dingle's (Mark Charnock) wedding and Priya's wedding to Rakesh Kotecha (Pasha Bocarie). When flirting with Megan's boyfriend, Jai, Leyla realises that she has a crush on him, touches him and they end up copulating. Leyla tries to end her affair with Jai repeatedly but keeps falling for his charms and they are caught by Rakesh. Leyla swears Rakesh to secrecy but her friends become suspicious, knowing that she is in a secret relationship. Jai and Leyla are nearly caught by Megan but Leyla manages to hide. After Jai is rushed to hospital following an accident at home, Megan discovers Jai and Leyla's affair. She tries to convince Leyla to sell her half of the business to her, but Leyla refuses. She does, however, agree to stay away from Jai and Megan reconciles with him.

Leyla supports Alicia when she is sexually assaulted by Lachlan White (Thomas Atkinson), and helps Alicia, David and Jacob through their difficult time. She slaps Georgia Sharma (Trudie Goodwin), for snide remarks about Alicia dress sense, saying that is what made Lachlan attack her. Alicia changes her style and appearance, upsetting Leyla as she tries to convince her sister not to change because of what Lachlan did. She is pleased for Alicia and David when they decide to move to Portugal but argues with Alicia on realising that she will not be able to spend time with Jacob. Leyla rekindles her affair with Jai, who is still with Megan, and he promises that he will marry Leyla after leaving Megan, which excites her. However, her feelings are challenged when she sees him violently grab Rachel Breckle's (Gemma Oaten) and threaten to murder her if she does not give him custody of their son, Archie. Leyla tells the court about Jai's behaviour, which causes Jai to lose his case for residency. The affair ends when she thinks that Megan has miscarried Jai's baby.

Alicia returns to the village when Val is killed in a helicopter crash and is shocked by David's plans to stay and buy the shop back. When Alicia and David announce their separation, Leyla tries to make David see what he is throwing away and books him a ticket to Portugal but he refuses to go, frustrating Leyla. She says a tearful farewell to Alicia and Jacob and insists David made the wrong decision. Leyla tells him that Alicia is filing for divorce and is annoyed that he does not care.

Leyla begins dating Pete Barton (Anthony Quinlan) and they become engaged. However, they end the relationship after deciding, on their wedding day, that they are rushing things. She later discovers from Pete's mother, Emma Barton (Gillian Kearney), that Pete had been having an affair with Leyla's best friend, Priya. She attacks Priya in the salon after finding out and declares they are no longer friends.

Following the death of Pete's mother, Emma, and younger brother, Finn Barton (Joe Gill), Leyla supports Pete as a friend, however is shocked to learn that Pete could potentially be the father of his aunt, Moira Dingle's (Natalie J. Robb) baby after having sex with her while engaged to Leyla. After learning that Emma was murdered, Leyla also informs the police that Priya had threatened Emma.

Reception
A reporter from Holy Soap named Leyla's most "memorable moment" as being when she thought Rodney was attempting to seduce her.

References

External links
 Character profile at itv.com
 Character profile at Holy Soap

Emmerdale characters
Television characters introduced in 2008
Female characters in television
Fictional shopkeepers
Fictional factory workers
Fictional female businesspeople
Fictional erotic dancers
Fictional dominatrices
Fictional kidnappers
Fictional drug addicts
Fictional cocaine users